Ryan James Hartman (born April 21, 1994) is an American professional baseball pitcher for the Tri-City ValleyCats of the Frontier League. He previously played in Major League Baseball (MLB) for the Houston Astros. He made his MLB debut in 2021.

Career
Hartman attended Cypress College, Lindsey Wilson College, and Tennessee Wesleyan University, helping lead Lindsey Wilson (2015) and Tennessee Wesleyan (2016) to the NAIA World Series.

Houston Astros
The Houston Astros selected him in the ninth round, 277th overall, of the 2016 MLB draft. He made his professional debut with the Tri-City ValleyCats, posting a 2.36 earned run average (ERA) in 14 appearances.

In 2017, Hartman split the season between the High-A Buies Creek Astros and the Single-A Quad Cities River Bandits, recording a cumulative 
5–7 record and 3.64 ERA in 25 games between the two teams. The following year, Hartman pitched for the Double-A Corpus Christi Hooks, logging an 11–4 record and 2.69 ERA with 143 strikeouts in  innings pitched. In 2019, Hartman played for the Triple-A Round Rock Express, registering a 6–7 record and 5.84 ERA in 25 appearances.

Hartman did not play in a game in 2020 due to the cancellation of the minor league season because of the COVID-19 pandemic. He was assigned to the Triple-A Sugar Land Skeeters to begin the 2021 season, where he recorded a 2–2 record and 3.98 ERA with 49 strikeouts in  innings pitched.

On June 30, 2021, Hartman was selected to the 40-man roster and promoted to the major leagues for the first time. He made his MLB debut that day, pitching in relief against the Baltimore Orioles. In the game, he notched his first career strikeout, against Orioles infielder Ryan Mountcastle. The Astros designated Hartman for assignment on July 25.

Baltimore Orioles
The Baltimore Orioles claimed Hartman off waivers, following the trade of Shawn Armstrong, on July 30. He was assigned to the Triple-A Norfolk Tides. On August 18, Hartman was designated for assignment by the Orioles. On August 20, Hartman cleared waivers and was assigned outright to Triple-A Norfolk. On August 6, 2022, Hartman was released by the Orioles.

Tri-City ValleyCats
On August 15, 2022, Hartman signed with the Tri-City ValleyCats of the Frontier League.

References

External links

Living people
1994 births
Baseball players from Anaheim, California
Major League Baseball pitchers
Houston Astros players
Tennessee Wesleyan Bulldogs baseball players
Tri-City ValleyCats players
Quad Cities River Bandits players
Buies Creek Astros players
Corpus Christi Hooks players
Caribes de Anzoátegui players
Round Rock Express players
Sugar Land Skeeters players
American expatriate baseball players in Venezuela
Norfolk Tides players